Robert Russ may refer to:

 Robert Russ (painter) (1847–1922), Austrian painter
 Robert Edwin Russ (1830–1902), founder of Ruston, Louisiana
 Robert D. Russ (1933–1997), United States Air Force general
 Robert Russ (music producer) (born 1971), German music producer